Veena Verma (born 1 September 1941) is a former member of parliament from Madhya Pradesh as an Indian National Congress candidate. She was elected to the Rajya Sabha as a Member of Parliament for three consecutive six year terms, from 1986 to 2000. She served as the Deputy Chairman of Committee of Parliament on Official Language and also as the Vice-president of All India Mahila Congress and Indian Council of World Affairs.

Verma is the widow of Shrikant Verma (1931-1986), Hindi poet and co-member of parliament from Madhya Pradesh. Verma is the mother of Abhishek Verma, an Indian arms dealer. Verma’s daughter-in-law Anca Verma is former Miss Universe Romania.

References

Rajya Sabha members from Madhya Pradesh
1941 births
Living people
Indian National Congress politicians
People from Madhya Pradesh
Indian National Congress politicians from Madhya Pradesh